Wallace Bunnell Anthony Smith (born July 29, 1929) is an American who was Prophet-President of the Reorganized Church of Jesus Christ of Latter Day Saints (RLDS) (now Community of Christ), from April 5, 1978, through April 15, 1996.  The son of W. Wallace Smith, he was designated as his father’s successor in 1976 and ordained church president in 1978, when his father retired to emeritus status. Wallace B. Smith is a great-grandson of Joseph Smith (founder of the Latter Day Saint movement), and was a practicing ophthalmologist in the Independence, Missouri, area before accepting ordination to RLDS leadership.

Smith's presidency was notable for authorizing construction of the church’s temple in Independence, Missouri, with construction occurring from 1990 to 1994.  His presidency was also noted for promoting a church conference vote on April 5, 1984, which approved ordination of females to priesthood offices: The first ordination took place on November 17, 1985. Smith is also credited with being one of the first church leaders to formally propose a name-change for the church, at a Joint Council retreat in 1994. At the subsequent World Conference in 1996, the proposed name change (to "Community of Christ" from "Reorganized Church of Jesus Christ of Latter Day Saints") was not approved by a majority vote at that time, but conference approval did take place during the April 2000 World Conference, four years after Smith's retirement as the church's prophet-president.

On September 19, 1995, Smith announced he was retiring as prophet, seer and revelator of the church, and designated W. Grant McMurray as his successor. Smith formally retired on April 15, 1996, at which time his successor McMurray was ordained in a ceremony at the RLDS Auditorium. Smith was designated "President Emeritus," as his father likewise had been designated in 1978 upon ordination of his son. Smith still holds the position to this day.

References

Further reading 
 Laurie Smith Monsees, The Temple: Dedicated to Peace, Herald House: 1993.

External links 
Community of Christ's online history of Wallace B. Smith

1929 births
American Latter Day Saints
American leaders of the Community of Christ
Doctrine and Covenants people
Living people
People from Lamoni, Iowa
Prophet-Presidents of the Community of Christ
Religious leaders from Iowa
Smith family (Latter Day Saints)